Psammophis odysseus is an extinct species of terrestrial snake belonging to the family Psammophiidae. It lived around 5.5 million years ago and was discovered in Salobreña, Spain by Georgios Georgalis. It is believed to have inhabited Africa and migrated to Eurasia.

Studies

The original fossils discovered of the species are held at Museum of Natural Sciences in Madrid, Spain. It was studied on by several scientists working on a project for the Institute of Systematics and Evolution of Animals of the Polish Academy of Sciences in Krakow.

References

Psammophis
Miocene Europe
Prehistoric snakes
Fossil taxa described in 2022